The Data Act is a European Union legislative proposal that aims to create a framework which will encourage data sharing. The European Commission was expected to formally present the act in the fourth quarter of 2021. Notwithstanding, the proposal was formally issued on 23February 2022.

European (harmonised) standards may be drafted by the European Standardization Organizations (ESOs) following standardisation requests from the European Commission in order to support the application of the requirement that 'products shall be designed and manufactured, and related services shall be provided, in such a manner that data generated by their use are, by default, easily, securely and, where relevant and appropriate, directly accessible to the user'. In addition, European standards and technical specifications in the meaning of Article II of Regulation (EU) 1025/2012 on European Standardisation may also support the issuing of "standard" contracts or transparency on how data will be used.

A draft of the proposed act had earlier been leaked on 2 February 2022, and was swiftly opposed by industry.

If implemented in its proposed form the Act would impact on data rights current under Directive 96/9/EC of the European Parliament and of the Council of 11 March 1996 on the legal protection of databases (the Database Directive). The European Data Act will not apply to the financial sector in Switzerland.

See also 

 Data Governance Act
 General Data Protection Regulation
 Artificial Intelligence Act
 Digital Services Act
 Digital Markets Act
 European Health Data Space

References

External links 

 European Parliament Legislative Train Schedule
 European Commission Press, background to Data Act: Commission proposes measures to boost data sharing and support European data spaces

European Digital Strategy
Policies of the European Union
Data laws of Europe
Database law
Draft European Union laws
European Union regulations